This is a list of poets either born in Syria or holding Syrian citizenship.

A
 Omar Abu Risha
 Adunis
 Mamdouh Adwan
 Darin Ahmad
 Ninos Aho
 Khalaf Ali Alkhalaf
 Osama Alomar
 Nasib Arida
 Assad Ali
 Krayem Awad
 Maram al-Masri

B
 Muhammad Salim Barakat

 Salim Barakat

C
 Cyrillona

H
 Ahmad Ali Hasan
 Qustaki al-Himsi
 Khalil al-Hindawi
 Amira Abul Husn

J
 Nouzad Ja'adan
 Badawi al-Jabal
 Nouri al-Jarrah

K
 Mohja Kahf
 Yusuf al-Khal
 Khaled Khalifa
 Hasan al-Khayer
 Colette Khoury

M
 Muhammad al-Maghut
 Nabil Maleh
Abd al-Mu'in Mallouhi
 Khalil Mardam Bey
 Francis Marrash
 Maryana Marrash
 Adwar Mousa

N
 Hamida Nana
 Ahlam al-Nasr
 Nazih Abu Afach
 Salwa Al Neimi

Q
 Nizar Qabbani

S
 Hassan Ibrahim Samoun
 Abd al-Rahman al-Shaghouri
 Maqbula al-Shalak

W
 Raed Wahesh

Y
 Muhammad al-Yaqoubi

 
Poets
Syrian